The Muzium Negara station is an underground mass rapid transit (MRT) station in Kuala Lumpur, Malaysia on the . It is located beneath Jalan Damansara in front of the Muzium Negara (Malay; English: National Museum), which gave the station its name.

Although located near Kuala Lumpur Sentral, it is not part of the complex. It is however linked via a 240-metre covered pedestrian walkway to KL Sentral. For this reason, the working name given to the station at the planning stage, which was "KL Sentral station" was not adopted.

Station features

Location
The station is located beneath Jalan Damansara to the southwest of the historical city center of Kuala Lumpur. It is located to the north of and adjacent to, but not within, the KL Sentral development. To the north of the station is the Muzium Negara while to the nearest buildings to the south of the station are Menara CIMB, Q Sentral and St Regis Kuala Lumpur, which are part of the KL Sentral development.

Station layout

Entrances and exits
The station has 3 entrances/exits, of which 2 lead to both sides of Jalan Damansara while the last one connects to the pedestrian link way which leads to the KL Sentral Station and other buildings in the KL Sentral development. Entrance B, which is the main entrance, is located directly in front of the Muzium Negara.

The KL Sentral-Muzium Negara MRT station pedestrian link way leads directly to the station paid area and does not allow any passing through to access the Muzium Negara. To access the Muzium Negara from KL Sentral, pedestrians should use entrance A by walking through Menara CIMB and then go through the unpaid area of the station and then exit at entrance B to get to the Muzium Negara main entrance. The reverse applies for pedestrians going from the Muzium Negara to KL Sentral.

Link to Kuala Lumpur Sentral Station

Commuters transferring between Muzium Negara MRT station and KL Sentral Transport Hub are required to walk through a 240-metre pedestrian link; which is partially elevated and underground. The link was constructed by Malaysian Resources Corporation Berhad (MRCB) at a cost of RM50 million.

From Muzium Negara MRT station, the pedestrian link begins after the fare gates at Entrance C, where there are three flights of escalators which bring pedestrians to an elevated walkway above Jalan Stesen Sentral 5. The walkway is connected to various buildings such as Q Sentral, Menara CIMB, Le Meredian, Hilton and Platinum Sentral. The walkway also leads to KL Sentral Station, where an escalator brings users to the KLIA Ekspres arrival hall.

In addition to constructing the new pedestrian link, renovations to cater to the increase passenger volume were also carried out at KL Sentral station, such as widening the walkway between the KLIA Ekspres arrival hall and the main transit concourse by removing the retail outlets that used to line the walkway. Additional signage was also installed.

Commuters are also able to connect to the  KL Monorail by walking through the NU Sentral Mall connected to KL Sentral.

As the pedestrian links directly to the paid area of the Muzium Negara MRT station, it does not allow any walk through access for those from KL Sentral walking to the Muzium Negara itself or vice versa. Pedestrians from KL Sentral headed to the Muzium Negara should use the pedestrian link to head to Menara CIMB, exit to ground level to access entrance A of the station behind the building, cross under Jalan Damansara via the unpaid area of the station, and access the Muzium Negara via entrance B of the station.

Interior design
Similar to Pasar Seni and Bukit Bintang stations, the exterior of the above-ground station entrances are influenced by quartz crystals found at Bukit Tabur quartz range in Gombak, Selangor, just outside the northeastern limits of Kuala Lumpur.

As with the other underground stations of the MRT Sungai Buloh-Kajang Line, the Muzium Negara MRT station was given a unique interior design theme, which was the History of public transportation in Kuala Lumpur, in view of its proximity to the National Museum.

Gallery

Station

Muzium Negara MRT station-KL Sentral Pedestrian Link

References

External links
 Muzium Negara MRT Station | mrt.com.my
 Klang Valley Mass Rapid Transit website

2017 establishments in Malaysia
Rapid transit stations in Kuala Lumpur
Railway stations opened in 2017
Sungai Buloh-Kajang Line